Paolo Bucinelli (25 April 1952 – 7 January 2021), known professionally as Solange, was an Italian television personality, psychic and commentator.

Publications 
 Voglio volervi bene, Milano, Greco & Greco, 1996. ISBN 88-7980-102-3.
 Rompi Solange e trovi Paolo, prefazione di Gigi Sabani, Pavia, Il Girasole d'oro, 1997. ISBN 88-7072-801-3.
 Io, Solange, vi insegno a leggere la mano e..., Pavia, Iuculano, 2004. ISBN 88-7072-670-3.
 Mani da VIP, allegato alla rivista Vero, 2006
 Orsacchiotto corallina mamma, Lainate, A.CAR., 2009. ISBN 978-88-6490-002-5.
 Esserci. [Poesie, pensieri, foto e l'oroscopo portafortuna per il 2014], Livorno, Debatte, 2013. ISBN 978-88-6297-165-2.
 I fiori dentro. Raccolta di emozioni, Villanova di Guidonia, Aletti, 2013. ISBN 978-88-591-1217-4.

Filmografphy 

 Ragazzi della notte, dir. Jerry Calà (1995)
 T'amo e t'amerò, dir. Ninì Grassia (1999)
 Solo un'ora d'amore (2006)
 Matrimonio alle Bahamas, dir. Claudio Risi (2007)

References

1952 births
2021 deaths
Italian television personalities
Italian psychics